The European Champion Clubs Cup is an annual athletics competition between the European athletics clubs that are the reigning champions at national level.

The competition is organised by the European Athletics Association and was first held in 1975 as a men's only event. A separate women's competition was initiated in 1981. Due to large number of nations entering teams, a divisional format was introduced in 1988 for men and 1995 for women. Each club enters 1 athlete per individual event, except in the men's cups of 1975 and between 1977 and 1982 when 2 athletes were entered per individual event.

Editions

Men's competitions

Women's competitions

Mixed Competitions

Winners

Men's

Women's

References

External links
 History of the event from European Athletics

Clubs Cup
Recurring sporting events established in 1975
Athletics European
Annual sporting events